The painted goby (Pomatoschistus pictus) is a small goby of Western European waters from Trondheim Fjord to Spain, the Canary Islands and is sometimes reported in the Mediterranean Sea. Also mentioned in the Black Sea. Its young may sometimes be found in tide pools. It feeds on amphipods and copepods.

Description
The painted goby is a relatively small goby, only growing to 6 cm in length, although some may grow to 9.5 cm. It is fawn-brown, with a row of four double dark brown spots along the sides. The dorsal fin has rows of dark brown-black spots interspersed with bands of iridescent blue and pink.

References

External links
Breeding sounds of the painted goby
A good picture of a painted goby

pictus
Fish of the Atlantic Ocean
Fish of the Mediterranean Sea
Fish of the North Sea
Fish of the Baltic Sea
Fish of Europe
Fish described in 1865